Calliophis bibroni, commonly known as Bibron's coral snake, is a species of venomous snake in the family Elapidae. The species is native to India.

Etymology
The specific name, bibroni, is in honor of Gabriel Bibron (1806–1848), French zoologist and herpetologist.

Distribution and habitat
C. bibroni is endemic to the Western Ghats of India, essentially distributed in southern Karnataka state, Kerala state, and northwestern Tamil Nadu state.

Description
The eye of C. bibroni is minute, its diameter about half its distance from the mouth. The frontal is nearly as long as its distance from the snout, much shorter than parietals. As there is no preocular, the prefrontal contacts the third upper labial. There is one very small postocular. The temporals are 1+1. There are seven upper labials, the third and fourth contacting the eye. The first lower labial is much elongate, forming a long suture with its fellow. There are two pairs of chin shields. The anterior chin shields are small, much shorter than posterior, and are in contact with third and fourth lower labials.

The dorsal scales are smooth, without apical pits, and are in 13 rows at midbody. The ventrals number 222-226. The anal is entire. The subcaudals are divided and number 27-34 pairs.

Coloration is cherry-red to dark purplish brown above, red beneath, with black crossbands which are sometimes continuous across the belly. The anterior part of the head is black above.

Adults may attain a total length of 64 cm (25 inches), which includes a tail length of 5 cm (2 inches).

Diet
C. bibroni is ophiophagous, specializing in preying upon snakes of the family Uropeltidae.

Reproduction
C. bibroni is oviparous.

References

Further reading
Beddome RH (1864). "Description of a New Species of Elaps from Malabar". Proc. Zool. Soc. London 1864: 179.
Boulenger GA (1890). The Fauna of British India, Including Ceylon and Burma. Reptilia and Batrachia. London: Secretary of State for India in Council. (Taylor and Francis, printers). xviii + 541 pp. (Callophis [sic] bibronii, p. 386).
Deepak V, Harikrishnan S, Vasudevan K, Smith EN (2010). "Redescription of Bibron's coral snake, Calliophis bibroni Jan 1858 with notes and new records from south of the Palghat and Shencottah Gaps of the Western Ghats, India". Hamadryad 35 (1): 1–10.
Jan G (1858). "Plan d'une iconographie descriptive des ophidiens et description sommaire de nouvelles espèces des serpents". Revue et Magasin de Zoologie Pure et Appliquée, Paris, Series 2, 10: 438–449, 514–527. (Elaps bibroni, new species, p. 526). (in French).
Raveendran DK, Deepak V, Smith EN, Smart U (2017). "A new colour morph of Calliophis bibroni (Squamata: Elapidae) and evidence for Müllerian mimicry in Tropical Indian coralsnakes". Herpetology Notes 10: 209–217.
Slowinski JB, Boundy J, Lawson R (2001). "The Phylogenetic Relationships of Asian Coral Snakes (Elapidae: Calliophis and Maticora) Based on Morphological and Molecular Characters". Herpetologica 57 (2): 233–245.
Smith MA (1943). The Fauna of British India, Ceylon and Burma, Including the Whole of the Indo-Chinese Sub-region. Reptilia and Amphibia. Vol. III.—Serpentes. London: Secretary of State for India. (Taylor and Francis, printers). xii + 583 pp. (Callophis [sic] bibroni, pp. 425–426).

bibroni
Endemic fauna of the Western Ghats
Snakes of India
Taxa named by Giorgio Jan
Reptiles described in 1858